The men's tournament in Goalball at the 2016 Summer Paralympics was contested from 8 to 16 September.

Twelve teams participated, with six athletes per team.

Participating teams 

Group A
 (roster)
 (roster)
 (roster)
 (roster)
 (roster)

Group B
 (roster)
 (roster)
 (roster)
 (roster)
 (roster)

Preliminary round

Group A

Group B

Knock-out round

Quarter-finals

Semi-finals

Bronze medal match

Gold medal match

Final rankings

Source: Paralympic.org

See also 
Goalball at the 2016 Summer Paralympics – Women's tournament

References

External links 

Men's tournament